The Belfast Natural History and Philosophical Society  was founded in 1821 to promote the scientific study of animals, plants, fossils, rocks and minerals.

The Society was founded by George Crawford Hyndman, James Lawson Drummond, James Grimshaw, James McAdam, Robert Patterson, Robert Simms, Francis Archer, the Thomas Dix Hincks, Edward Hincks and Edmund Getty. Five years later in 1826 Alexander Henry Haliday and William Thompson both joined. In 1823, the Society's collection and the small collection begun in 1788 in the rooms of the Belfast Reading Society and that of the Belfast Literary Society were moved to Belfast Academical Institution where James Bryce was centralising Belfast's rapidly expanding natural history holdings. A new building opened at No. 7 College Square North in 1831.

How big were the first collections are unknown but the 1831 figure of 300 insects given when the Belfast Natural History and Philosophical Society Museum opened to non-members may refer to specimens on display. The research material would have been much more numerous and expanded rapidly during the next decade. Specimens from England, the West Indies, Lapland, France, Greece, Italy, Senegal, New Holland, Java, Sumatra, Ceylon, Mauritius, Colombia, Recife, Peru, Virginia, India and West Africa were acquired by gift. The Society maintained an excellent library and received many journals from corresponding members of English and continental natural history societies. Notable contributors were John Obadiah Westwood, Francis Walker, Carl August Dohrn), Maximilian Spinola and John Gould and Charles Darwin. Many of the collections and some of the books were transferred to the Trinity College Museum, Dublin in 1843 after the society became the Belfast Natural History and Philosophical Society in 1842 when lectures in chemistry, physics, engineering and were allowed. Specimens remaining in Belfast are kept in the Ulster Museum where they bear the tag BNHPS collection. The formerly central role of natural history and archaeology diminished from this year on and in 1863 the Belfast Naturalists' Field Club was founded. The fragmentary BNHS minute books (pre 1842) and few letters are in the Public Record Office of Northern Ireland, in Belfast.  The Society still exists today retaining ownership of the Old Museum Building, publishing occasional books, and running a lecture series out of the Linen Hall Library.

The museum
Musei Belfastiani

; J. Johnston, Redemptore.

The museum was the first erected in Ireland by public subscription. From its inception in 1831 and for 47 years the Museum employed a curator taxidermist named William Darragh (1813–1892). In the first report of the society he wrote an account entitled "Directions for preserving subjects in natural history". This covered birds, tortoises etc., lizards and serpents, fish, shells, corals, seafans etc., crabs, lobsters etc., asterias or starfish, insects, botanical specimens, seeds, minerals and Fossil. He notes, correctly anticipating foreign specimens "As there is now no vexatious delay or trouble experienced by Custom-house regulations, specimens of natural history being admitted free of duty, it is recommended that all packages may be entered in the ship's papers, and if a list of all the contents of each package could, with convenience, be attached inside the lid of the box or cover, the risk of injury to the specimens, by examination at the Custom-house, would in great measure be avoided". Also "Should it even happen that the specimens be already possessed by the Society, still duplicates are desirable, since such as are not possessed by the Museum can be readily exchanged for others that may be wanted".

Although the focus of the collections was primarily on zoology, botany and geology substantial archaeological, ethnographic and antiquarian acquisitions were made and in 1835 the Society gained an Egyptian mummy, Takabuti.

Whilst the members of the Society were middle class the museum was open to the working classes, at a small charge on Easter Mondays. Recorded figures for Easter Mondays 1845–1853 are:
1845 – 1,200 persons
1846 – 1,700 persons
1847 – 2,000 persons
1848 – 2,600 persons
1849 – 3,500 persons
1850 – 4,400 persons
1851 – 4,350 persons
1852 – 4,200 persons
1853 – 5,950 persons

The library
With the tumultuous years of 1789–1815, European culture was transformed by revolution, war and disruption. By ending many of the social and cultural props of the previous century, the stage was set for dramatic economic, political and social change of the Late Enlightenment of which the development of learned societies was a part. One of the most important developments that the Enlightenment era brought to the discipline of science was its popularisation. An increasingly literate population seeking knowledge and education in both the arts and the sciences drove the expansion of print culture and the dissemination of scientific learning. Popularization was generally part of an overarching Enlightenment ideal that endeavoured "to make information available to the greatest number of people". As public interest in natural philosophy grew during the 18th century, public lecture courses and the publication of popular texts opened up new roads to money and fame for amateurs and scientists who remained on the periphery of universities and academies. Books owned by the Belfast Natural History Society reflect such changes, although some of the more expensive works were the gift of Thomas Fortescue and Arthur Hill. They included:
Georges Cuvier, 1829 Regne Animalium, in English, The Animal Kingdom, published by Chez Deterville at Paris; 1832 Class Insecta Whitaker, London
Justin Pierre Marie Macquart, 1834–1835. Histoire naturelle des insectes. Dipteres Paris : Roret.
Pierre André LatreilleGenera crustaceorum et insectorum, secundum ordinem naturalem ut familias disposita (4 vols., 1806 1807 1807 1809)
Peter Simon Pallas Zoographia Rosso-asiatica
Friedrich Wilhelm Martini Neues systematisches Conchylien-Cabinet;
Emanuel Mendez da Costa A Natural History of Fossils (1757), Elements of Conchology, or An Introduction to the Knowledge of Shells (1776), British Conchology (1778)
Gilbert White The Natural History and Antiquities of Selborne (1789) 
Thomas Pennant History of Quadrupeds
Johannes Allart, Afbeeldingen der fraaiste, meest uitheemsche boomen en heesters. Amsterdam, Johannes Allart, 1802 [-1808];
William Smith Strata by Organized Fossils (1815);
Louis Agassiz Recherches sur les poissons fossiles (1833–1843);
Philipp Franz von Siebold  Fauna Japonica: Birds or Aves, 1844–1850 12 vol.; Fish or Pisces 1842–1850 16 vol.; Crustaceans or Crustacea 1833–1850 8 vol.; Mammals or Mammalia 1842–1844 4 vol
Pierre Barrère Ornithologiae Specimen Novum, sive Series Avium in Ruscinone, Pyrenaeis Montibus, atque in Galliâ Aequinoctiali Observatarum, in Classes, genera & species, novâ methodo, digesta (1745);
Julius Theodor Christian Ratzeburg Die Waldverderber und ihre Feinde, Berlin, 1841

Notable members
 John Templeton
 Robert Templeton
 James MacAdam
 Robert Shipboy MacAdam
 Thomas Graves R.N.
 Charles Wyville Thomson
 Ralph Tate
 James Bryce
 Thomas Andrews
 Thomas Workman
 John Grainger
 James Emerson Tennent
 John Grattan
 George Dickie
 James Grimshaw (naturalist)
 William Thomas Braithwaite

Gallery

See also
William Bullock A companion to Mr. Bullock's London Museum and Pantherion 1812  gives a notion of an early 19th-century museum, though not a scientific one.
Literary and Philosophical Society of Newcastle upon Tyne
Leskean Cabinet
Dublin University Zoological Association
Cuvierian Society of Cork

References
Foster, J. W. and Chesney, H. C. G (eds.), 1977.Nature in Ireland: A Scientific and Cultural History Lilliput Press .
Nash, R., 1983.  A brief summary of the development of entomology in Ireland during the years 1790–1870 Irish Naturalists' Journal 21:145–150.
Foster, J.W., 1990 Natural History, Science and Irish Culture. Author: Foster, John Wilson.The Irish Review, Volume 9, Number 1 pp. 61–69.

External links

  BHL Digitised Report of the Belfast Natural History and Philosophical Society
Library Ireland Dublin Penny Journal account

Natural history of the United Kingdom
Natural history of Ireland
History of Belfast
Natural history societies